María Paz Azagra Navascues (born 23 August 1982), commonly known as Mari Paz, is a former Spanish football midfielder. She played for SD Lagunak and Rayo Vallecano in Spain's Superliga Femenina, and Southampton Saints in England's Premier League.

She was a member of the Spanish national team.

International goals

Titles
 2 Spanish leagues (2009, 2010)

References

1982 births
Living people
Spanish women's footballers
Footballers from the Basque Country (autonomous community)
People from Azkoitia
FA Women's National League players
Southampton Saints L.F.C. players
Rayo Vallecano Femenino players
Spanish expatriate footballers
Expatriate women's footballers in England
Spanish expatriate sportspeople in England
Spain women's international footballers
Women's association football midfielders
Sportspeople from Gipuzkoa
SD Lagunak (women) players
21st-century Spanish women